Jasdeep Singh Gill (born 26 November 1988) is an Indian singer, live performer and actor associated with Punjabi and Hindi language music and films. He debuted in Punjabi cinema with the 2014 film Mr & Mrs 420 and in Hindi cinema with the 2018 film Happy Phirr Bhag Jayegi.

Personal life
Gill was born Jasdeep Singh Gill on 26 November 1988 in Jandali village near Khanna in Ludhiana district of Punjab. He studied at Gobindgarh Public College where he took up two practical subjects, music and physical education. He was trained to sing in local youth festivals. He bagged the second position four times consecutively. He struggled for three years before his debut. Gill is married and has a daughter, Roojas Kaur Gill.

Music career
Gill made his debut in 2011 with the album Batchmate which included the song "Churiyan". In 2012 he followed this up by releasing the single "Vigrey Sharabi". In January 2013 he released his second album "Batchmate 2", which included the song "Lancer" with lyrics by Narinder Batth. He followed this up with the song "Classmate" that featured in the movie Daddy Cool Munde Fool. In September 2013 he came out with another single, "Pyar Mera". After the release of his album Replay, he released the single "Nakhre" in 2017.

Film career 
Gill made his acting debut on the big screen in Mr & Mrs 420. He followed this up with Dil Vil Pyar Vyar. He paired with Roshan Prince and Simran Kaur Mundi in the romantic comedy Mundeyan Ton Bachke Rahin.

Gill signed to make a film with Gauahar Khan in February 2015, titled Oh Yaara Ainvayi Ainvayi Lut Gaya, which marked her debut in Punjabi films. He also starred in Channo Kamli Yaar Di alongside Neeru Bajwa. He debuted in Hindi cinema with the 2018 film Happy Phirr Bhag Jayegi, alongside Sonakshi Sinha, Diana Penty and Jimmy Sheirgill. It was released on 24 August 2018. In 2020, he acted in Panga, starring alongside Kangana Ranaut. He was last seen in 2021 film Kya Meri Sonam Gupta Bewafa Hai? co-starring Surbhi Jyoti in her debut film.

Media 
Gill was ranked in The Times Most Desirable Men at No. 42 in 2018, at No. 44 in 2019, at No. 42 in 2020.

He was ranked in the Chandigarh Times Most Desirable Men at No. 1 in 2018, at No. 2 in 2019 and at No. 1 in 2020.

Discography

Albums

Singles

Songs in films

Filmography

References

External links
 
 

1988 births
Punjabi-language singers
Living people
Singers from Punjab, India
Bhangra (music) musicians
Male actors in Punjabi cinema
People from Ludhiana district
Male actors from Ludhiana